The cycling competitions at the 1988 Olympic Games in Seoul consisted of two different categories: road cycling and track cycling. Nine events were contested, including the first women's sprint event at the Olympics.

Road cycling

Men's

Women's

Track cycling

Men's

Women's

Participating nations
422 cyclists from 62 nations competed.

Medal table

References

External links
 Official Report

 
1988 Summer Olympics events
1988
1988 in track cycling
1988 in road cycling
1988 in cycle racing